In geometry, Euler's theorem states that the distance d between the circumcenter and incenter of a triangle is given by

or equivalently

where  and  denote the circumradius and inradius respectively (the radii of the circumscribed circle and inscribed circle respectively). The theorem is named for  Leonhard Euler, who published it in 1765. However, the same result was published earlier by William Chapple in 1746.

From the theorem follows the Euler inequality:

which holds with equality only in the equilateral case.

Stronger version of the inequality
A stronger version is

Euler's theorem for the escribed circle
If  and  denote respectively the radius of the escribed circle opposite to the vertex  and the distance between its center and the center of 
the circumscribed circle, then .

Euler's inequality in absolute geometry
Euler's inequality, in the form stating that, for all triangles inscribed in a given circle, the maximum of the radius of the inscribed circle is reached for the equilateral triangle and only for it, is valid in absolute geometry.

See also
Fuss' theorem for the relation among the same three variables in bicentric quadrilaterals
Poncelet's closure theorem, showing that there is an infinity of triangles with the same two circles (and therefore the same R, r, and d)
List of triangle inequalities

References

External links

Articles containing proofs
Triangle inequalities
Theorems about triangles and circles